Gubbi Assembly constituency is one of the 224 constituencies in the Karnataka Legislative Assembly of Karnataka a south state of India. It is also part of Tumkur Lok Sabha constituency.

Members of Legislative Assembly

Mysore State
 1951: C. M. Annayyappa, Indian National Congress

 1957: C. J. Mukkannappa, Independent

 1962: V. M. Deo, Independent

 1967: Chikkegowda, Indian National Congress

 1972: Gatti Chandrashekar, Indian National Congress

Karnataka State
 1978: Gatti Chandrashekar, Indian National Congress (Indira)

 1983: S. Revanna, Janata Party

 1985: G. S. Shivananjappa, Indian National Congress

 1989: G. S. Shivananjappa, Indian National Congress

 1994: G. S. Shivananjappa, Independent

 1999: N. Veeranna Gowda, Janata Dal (Secular)

 2004: S. R. Srinivas, Janata Dal (Secular)

 2008: S. R. Srinivas, Janata Dal (Secular)

 2013: S. R. Srinivas, Janata Dal (Secular)

 2018: S. R. Srinivas, Janata Dal (Secular)

See also
 List of constituencies of Karnataka Legislative Assembly
 Tumkur district

References

Assembly constituencies of Karnataka
Tumkur district